Koah is a rural locality in the Shire of Mareeba, Queensland, Australia. In the  Koah had a population of 602 people.

Geography 
The Tablelands railway line enters the locality from the north-west (Kuranda) and passes through the north of the locality, which is served by Koah railway station, before exiting to the north-west (Bibhoora).

History 
In the  Koah had a population of 602 people.

References 

Shire of Mareeba
Localities in Queensland